is a Japanese film serving as the theatrical adaptation of the 2014 Super Sentai television series Ressha Sentai ToQger. It was released on July 19, 2014, as a double-billing with Kamen Rider Gaim: Great Soccer Battle! Golden Fruits Cup!. It features the ToQgers helping out Lady, conductor of the Galaxy Line, after she is attacked by Count Nair of the Shadow Line, portrayed by musician Hyadain. Hyadain said that as a child he enjoyed Dengeki Sentai Changeman, Choushinsei Flashman, and Hikari Sentai Maskman and hoped that he would portray the character well.

The film introduces the Safari Ressha, which transforms into SafariGaOh.

Plot
The Galaxy Line is about to return to Earth after 25 years running in space when it is attacked by a Cryner piloted by Count Nair. Lady, the Galaxy Line conductor, falls on Earth only with the Lion Ressha, while the other Safari Ressha that compose the Galaxy Line go missing, but she is rescued by the ToQgers. While Count Nair pays a visit to Emperor Z at the Castle Terminal, Right makes a plan to impulse the Lion Ressha back into space by using a local tower as part of a bridge, but Lady points out that there is not enough Imagination on Earth to power it up, claiming that with the decline of space exploration, people stopped aiming at the stars like they used to 50 years ago when the Galaxy Line was established.

Soon after, Count Nair and his partner, the Hound Shadow attack the ToQgers in order to hunt down the Lion Ressha, but while Right flees with Lady, the other four ToQgers stay behind to cover for them. Assisted by Akira, who appears to help them as well, Right runs with the Rainbow Line, dragging the Lion Ressha with it, but there is not enough Imagination to complete the bridge. However, the Fire Ressha uses its extinguisher to create a rainbow, drawing the attention of all the children in the vicinity and inspiring their Imagination, allowing Right to complete the bridge

Now with a way back to space opened, Lady thanks Right and lends him the five Safari Ressha, which the ToQgers use to defeat Count Nair and Hound Shadow. However, the two enlarge and combine, proving themselves too strong for the ToQgers and their Ressha. But Lady returns in time with all five of the Safari Ressha gathered to form SafariGaOh to allow the ToQgers to defeat Count Nair and Hound Shadow for good. After Right returns the Safari Ressha to Lady, she bids farewell to the ToQgers and departs from Earth to start another 25-year-long journey through the stars.

Cast
: 
: 
: 
: 
: 
: 
: 
: 
: 
, ToQger Equipment Voice: 
: 
: M·A·O
: 
: 
: 
: 
: 
: KENN

Songs
Theme song

Lyrics: 
Composition & Arrangement: 
Artist: 
Insert song

Lyrics: Shoko Fujibayashi
Composition: Takafumi Iwasaki
Arrangement: Takeharu Nakahata
Artist: Akira Kushida, Mitsuko Horie

Promotion

To promote the film, Tsutomu Sekine, Jun Shison, and Haruka Fukukara unveiled a special ToQger livery Keikyu train at Shinagawa Station on July 14, 2014.

References

External links

2010s Super Sentai films
2014 films